Gymnothorax neglectus is a moray eel found in the northwest Pacific Ocean, around Taiwan and Japan. It was first named by Shigeho Tanaka in 1911.

References

fish described in 1911
neglectus
Fish of the Pacific Ocean